South Aylesbury Halt was a railway station which was opened in 1933 and was closed in 1967. It was located on the Aylesbury–Princes Risborough line.

History
The station was opened by the Great Western Railway on 13 February 1933 to serve factories in the locality, as well as the Southcourt housing estate. It was situated on a foot crossing between Mandeville Road and Old Stoke Road. In 1966, British Rail proposed the closure of the station which was queried by the East Midlands Transport Users Consultative Committee (TUCC) as usage figures showed that receipts were £130 per year while direct costs were only £26. British Rail subsequently justified the closure on the basis of anticipated renewal costs of £2,500 and the TUCC approved the closure, as there would be no hardship caused. The station closed on 5 June 1967.

Present day
The station was demolished after closure and no trace remains. Pedestrian access across the railway was maintained at the station site until a fatality in November 2016 when a cyclist was killed. The crossing has since been closed.

References

Former Great Western and Great Central Joint Railway stations
Disused railway stations in Buckinghamshire
Railway stations in Great Britain opened in 1933
Railway stations in Great Britain closed in 1967